The 14th Lavant Cup was a motor race, run for Formula One cars, held on 23 April 1962 at Goodwood Circuit, England. The race was run over 21 laps of the circuit, and was won by New Zealand driver Bruce McLaren in a Cooper T55.

This race was held directly before the 1962 Glover Trophy, on the same day at the same circuit, with some drivers taking part in both events. Another Formula One race, the 1962 Pau Grand Prix, was also held on the same day. The Lavant Cup was normally a Formula Two race, but for 1962 it was open to Formula One cars with four-cylinder engines, thus excluding the BRMs and those cars using the Climax V8 engine. The V6 Ferraris were at the Pau event, so they were not affected by this rule.

McLaren won the race comfortably after John Surtees' car was hit by Günther Seiffert at the chicane while the Briton was lapping him.

Results

Team Lotus entered a car for this race and was given No. 3, but withdrew without designating a driver.

References
 "The Grand Prix Who's Who", Steve Small, 1995.
 "The Formula One Record Book", John Thompson, 1974.

Lavant Cup
Lavant Cup
Lavant Cup
Lavant Cup